Federal Patent Court may refer to: 

 Federal Patent Court of Germany
 Federal Patent Court of Switzerland

See also 
 Patent court